Yoann Damet is a French association football coach who is currently an assistant coach with Columbus Crew in Major League Soccer. He twice served as interim head coach of FC Cincinnati at ages 29 and 30, making him the youngest head or assistant coach in Major League Soccer.

Early life
Damet was born on 19 March 1990 in Marseille, France. He first started playing football at age 8 following the 1998 FIFA World Cup, which was both hosted in and won by France. At age 17, he says he played club football at the fifth tier of the French football league system. However, he did not think he was skilled enough to play professionally, so he turned his interests to coaching at age 16. In 2011, he earned a degree in sports training with a specialty in football from the University of Burgundy in Dijon, France.

Career
Damet began his managerial career at age 16 with the sixth-tier club Beaune FC, where he spent five years as the under-13 coach. He then moved on to the fourth division club Jura Sud Foot, where he was the head coach of the U-15 and U-17 teams for two years. He also spent a season managing the U-14 district tournament of the department of Jura in the Bourgogne-Franche-Comté region. In 2013, he joined the academy staff of Dijon FCO, then in Ligue 2, and served as the U-11 head coach.

In 2014, he moved to Canada to work for the Montreal Impact Academy. Initially he worked as the U-12 head coach, but became the U-18 head coach in December 2015.

In March 2017, he left Montreal to join FC Cincinnati in the United Soccer League as an assistant coach. FC Cincinnati retained Damet through their transition up to Major League Soccer in 2019.

On 7 May 2019, Cincinnati head coach Alan Koch was fired after starting the season with just 8 points through 11 games and, according to club president Jeff Berding, "a series of recent issues and a team culture that had deteriorated". As a result, Damet was named interim head coach while an international search was undertaken for a permanent replacement. Damet's first match as head coach was a 2–1 win on 11 May against his former club Montreal Impact. This ended both a seven-match winless streak and a 528-minute scoring drought for the club. However, this was followed by another losing streak which lasted six regular season matches. Damet's tenure as interim coach ended after 15 matches when FC Cincinnati announced the hiring of Ron Jans on 4 August.

Jans resigned from his head coach position on 17 February 2020 amidst an investigation into his use of a racial slur. The club once again selected Damet to serve as interim coach while a permanent replacement was sought.

On 27 September 2021, Damet was released from the club along with head coach Jaap Stam and fellow assistant coach Said Bakkati.

Damet was named head coach of LA Galaxy II in USL Championship on 28 January 2022. Damet joined the LA Galaxy first team staff on August 26, 2022.

Managerial statistics

References

External links

 

Living people
1990 births
Expatriate soccer managers in Canada
Expatriate soccer managers in the United States
French expatriate football managers
French expatriate sportspeople in Canada
French expatriate sportspeople in the United States
CF Montréal non-playing staff
FC Cincinnati non-playing staff
FC Cincinnati coaches
French football managers
Sportspeople from Marseille
LA Galaxy II coaches
USL Championship coaches
LA Galaxy coaches